Olaf Thon (born 1 May 1966) is a German former professional football player and coach.

Mainly a central midfielder, Thon's 19-year professional career was solely associated to Schalke 04 and Bayern Munich, having amassed more than 500 official games and 100 goals for both combined. Later in his career, Thon played as a sweeper. Nicknamed The Professor, he also collected more than 50 caps for the Germany national team.

Club career

Thon made his professional debuts at the age of only 17, with local powerhouse FC Schalke 04. His impact was immediate, as he scored 14 goals in 38 games to help the Gelsenkirchen side return to the Bundesliga in 1984, as runners-up. Also during that season, he scored a hat-trick against Bayern Munich in the DFB-Pokal, in a 6–6 home thriller in the semi-final stage; the Bavarians eventually won the replay and the tournament.

On 24 August 1984, Thon made his first appearance in the German top level, a 3–1 loss at Borussia Mönchengladbach. During that and the following three seasons, he only scored once in single digits, rarely missing a match for the team.

In the summer of 1988, Thon signed with national giants FC Bayern Munich, as a replacement for Inter Milan-bound Lothar Matthäus. He scored eight in 32 games in his first season, helping the side to the league conquest, which also befell the following year, with the player posting an equal scoring record.

Thon returned to his first club Schalke in 1994, at the age of 28, after winning another league title, although he spent most of the season injured and Matthäus had already returned to Bayern. During his second spell, he played almost exclusively as a sweeper and, in his third year, played in a total of 46 official games, helping his club to the season's UEFA Cup final, where he scored his attempt in the penalty shootout win against Inter (1–1 on aggregate); Schalke could only finish 12th in the domestic league, however.

In his later years, Thon suffered extensively with injuries, only appearing in nine matches in his last two seasons combined. He retired in June 2002 at the age of 36, with Bundesliga totals of 443 games and 82 goals. Subsequently, he worked as marketing manager for the club, until August 2009.

International career
Thon made his debut for Germany (then West Germany) on 16 December 1984, playing the second half of a 3–2 win in Malta for the 1986 FIFA World Cup qualifiers.

Subsequently, he was selected for the squads at three FIFA World Cups, helping the nation win the tournament in the 1990 edition in Italy: after only six minutes against Colombia in the group stage (1–1), he played the entire semifinal against England, also scoring in his penalty shootout attempt (1–1 after 120 minutes).

Thon also represented Germany at the UEFA Euro 1988 played on home soil, scoring through a rare header against Denmark (2–0 group stage win), and playing all the matches and minutes for the eventual semifinalists. Due to either injuries or run-ins with national team manager Berti Vogts, the player missed the 1994 World Cup and the Euro 1992 and 1996 tournaments, ending his 14-year international career with 52 caps (three goals). His last international match came against Iran in Germany's last group stage game during the 1998 FIFA World Cup.

Managerial career
On 1 February 2010, Thon was appointed head coach of VfB Hüls, beginning to work on 3 April.

Career statistics

Club

Managerial statistics

Honours
Schalke 04
UEFA Cup: 1996–97
DFB-Pokal: 2000–01, 2001–02

Bayern Munich
Bundesliga: 1988–89, 1989–90, 1993–94
DFB-Supercup: 1990

Germany
FIFA World Cup: 1990; runner-up: 1986

References

External links

1966 births
Living people
Sportspeople from Gelsenkirchen
German footballers
Association football defenders
Association football midfielders
Association football utility players
Bundesliga players
2. Bundesliga players
FC Schalke 04 players
FC Bayern Munich footballers
Germany international footballers
Germany under-21 international footballers
Germany youth international footballers
1986 FIFA World Cup players
UEFA Euro 1988 players
1990 FIFA World Cup players
1998 FIFA World Cup players
FIFA World Cup-winning players
UEFA Cup winning players
VfB Hüls managers
Footballers from North Rhine-Westphalia
German football managers
STV Horst-Emscher players
West German footballers
FC Schalke 04 non-playing staff